Cornelis "Kees" Hendricus van Wonderen (born 4 January 1969) is a Dutch professional football manager and former player, who is the current head coach of Eredivisie club Heerenveen. During his playing career, he was mostly utilised as a centre back.

Playing career

Club
Van Wonderen was born in Bergen, North Holland, and played professional football for NEC Nijmegen, NAC Breda and Feyenoord Rotterdam.

While at Feyenoord, Van Wonderen won the Eredivisie in 1999 and the 2001–02 UEFA Cup, as the club beat Borussia Dortmund 3–2 in the final at De Kuip.

International
He also won five caps for the Netherlands national team.

Coaching career
After his career as a professional footballer, he started as a scout at Feyenoord but left the position again after a few months. He then became assistant coach to Camiel Jager at his youth club VV Bennekom in December 2006.

In the summer of 2008 he accepted an offer from FC Twente to join the technical staff there under manager Steve McClaren. After two years, McClaren left Twente in the summer 2010 and following that, van Wonderen indicated that he wanted to take a step back to spend more time with his family. However, he signed a new deal with Twente in August 2010 as an assistant manager.

In October 2011, he was also added to the backroom staff of Netherlands U-16 and U-18 national teams as an assistant manager beside his job at Twente. Meanwhile, Van Wonderen and FC Twente decided to separate on 6 July 2012. However, by the request of his former Twente-colleague Alfred Schreuder who had been appointed head coach of Twente, van Wonderen returned to the club as an assistant manager at the end of February 2013.

In the summer 2015, van Wonderen left Twente and was appointed manager of Netherlands U-17 and U-18 national teams. At the start of the 2017/18 season, Van Wonderen was added to the technical staff of VVV-Venlo as an intern.

In March 2018, he was appointed assistant manager to Ronald Koeman for Netherlands A-team. He left this position in December 2019.

On 29 February 2020 Go Ahead Eagles confirmed, that van Wonderen from the upcoming season would become the club's new head coach.

Honours
Feyenoord
 Eredivisie: 1998–99
 Johan Cruyff Shield: 1999
 UEFA Cup: 2001–02

References

External links
 Beijen.net profile

1969 births
Living people
People from Bergen, North Holland
Footballers from North Holland
Association football defenders
Dutch footballers
NEC Nijmegen players
NAC Breda players
Feyenoord players
Eredivisie players
UEFA Cup winning players
Netherlands international footballers
Dutch football managers
FC Twente non-playing staff
Go Ahead Eagles managers
SC Heerenveen managers
Eerste Divisie managers
Eredivisie managers